The Institut d'étude des questions juives (IEQJ) (Institute for the Study of Jewish Questions) was an anti-Semitic propaganda organization created in France under the German occupation during World War II, with the support of the Propagandastaffel (German Propaganda Office) and under the regulation of the Gestapo.

Terminology 

The name of the organization is variously translated, with a majority using the literal rendering, Institute for the Study of Jewish Questions, while some sources in English use the more accurate Institute for the Study of Jewish Affairs.

It should not be confused with the Institute for Research on the Jewish Question, the Nazi party institute in Frankfurt.

Activities 

He remained in the post until 1942, and was succeeded by journalist René Gérard. The co-founder was Octave Bellet.

The IEQJ was based in Paris at 21 rue La Boétie in a building belonging to art dealer Paul Rosenberg, who was owner of a major art gallery in Paris that had been requisitioned by the Nazis. As a private organization under direct control of the German authority, the IEQJ had no formal link with the Vichy regime. Its main role was the spreading of anti-Semitic propaganda and the publication of the magazine  directed by André Chaumet which published 13 issues between November 1941 and February 1943.  This was followed by a second magazine entitled Revivre (with the subtitle "The great illustrated magazine about race") published from March 1943 to July 20, 1944, this time in direct connection with Vichy, and this, too, directed by Chaumet. The IEQJ also published  La Question juive en France ("The Jewish Question in France").

The most important action of the IEQJ was their sponsorship of the exhibition Le Juif et la France ("Jews and France") which began in September 1941.

Financing of the IEQJ was provided by the German intelligence service of the German Embassy and by Theodor Dannecker, head of the Amt IV J of the Gestapo, responsible for "the Jewish question". Funding was for 200,000 francs the first months, and 50,000 francs thereafter.

The IEQJ was absorbed into the propaganda department of the Commissariat-General for Jewish Affairs to be expanded, and replaced in March 1943 by Institut d'études des questions juives et ethnoraciales (IEQJR) ("Institute for the Study of Jewish and Ethno-Racial Issues") headed by George Montandon.

Sources 

  
 Pierre-André Taguieff, Grégoire Kauffmann, Mickaël Lenoire, L'antisémitisme de plume - 1940-1944 - études et documents, Paris, 1999, Berg International Éditeurs - 
 "Octave Bellet" in Laurent Joly, Les Collabos. Treize portraits d’après les archives des services secrets de Vichy, des Renseignements Généraux et de l’Épuration, Éditions Les Échappés, 2011 .

See also 

 Union générale des israélites de France
 Paris in World War II
 Antisemitism in France

References

Antisemitism in France
Political organizations based in France
Organizations established in 1941
Nazi propaganda